Kickapoo Cavern State Park is a state park straddling the Kinney and Edwards county line in Texas, located 22 miles north of Brackettville.

The state park 
Kickapoo Cavern was opened as a state park in 1991.

Interesting features of the park include 20 known caves, two of which are large enough to be significant. Kickapoo Cavern is approximately .25 mile in length (1400 feet). It contains 14 miles of mountain biking trails, and 18 miles of undesignated hiking and birding trails.

Tours 
Primitive tours of Kickapoo Cavern are scheduled every Saturday and require reservations.

Wildlife 
Mammals commonly found in the park include whitetail deer, raccoon, ringtail, gray fox, rock squirrel, porcupine, rabbit, and various other rodents. Commonly found birds are Gray vireo, Varied bunting, and Montezuma quail. Also, various uncommon species of reptiles and amphibians live in the park, including the Barking frog, Mottled Rock Rattlesnake, and Texas alligator lizard.

References

External links
 Kickapoo Cavern State Park

State parks of Texas
Caves of Texas
Show caves in the United States
Protected areas of Kinney County, Texas
Protected areas of Edwards County, Texas
Landforms of Kinney County, Texas
Landforms of Edwards County, Texas
Protected areas established in 1991
1991 establishments in Texas